The Punch and Judy Man is a 1963 black and white British comedy film made by Elstree Studios directed by Jeremy Summers from a script by Philip Oakes and Tony Hancock for the Associated British Picture Corporation. It was Hancock's second and last starring role in a film, following The Rebel (1961).

Plot
Wally Pinner is a Punch and Judy man working on the beach in the (fictional) seaside town of Piltdown. He works with his assistant (Hugh Lloyd) who also makes and repairs the puppets.

Wally and the other individuals who have beach businesses, including the Sandman (John Le Mesurier) who makes sand sculptures and Nevil the photographer (Mario Fabrizi), are a friendly community of people who pride themselves on their independence. This community is, however, frowned upon by the mayor (Ronald Fraser) and council, who consider it a social blight.

Wally's wife, Delia (Sylvia Syms), runs a seaside curios shop below their flat, and is socially ambitious for herself and also for Wally, despite his reluctance. To achieve this, she makes moves to have Wally invited to entertain at the official reception for Lady Jane Caterham (Barbara Murray), who is to switch on the town's illuminations. At the mayoress's suggestion the reception committee invites Wally to entertain, despite her husband's reluctance. Although their marriage is lacking in passion, Wally wants to please his wife and eventually agrees to do it.

The illumination ceremony ends in farce when Wally's electric shaver leads to a disruption of the power, resulting in some of the illuminated signs displaying unflattering comments about the town. Wally then puts on his show for the guests at the formal dinner and dance, but a drunken guest heckles Punch and disrupts the performance, leading to a food fight involving all the guests. Lady Jane's attempt to leave is blocked and she gets into an argument with Wally, during which she insults and slaps Delia who responds by flooring her with a punch, to the horror of the mayor and mayoress.

The next morning Delia has a black eye: her dreams of social acceptance have vanished, but Wally and Delia are now closer, and happily decide to leave Piltdown for pastures new.

Cast
Tony Hancock — Wally Pinner
Sylvia Syms — Delia Pinner, Wally's wife
Ronald Fraser — Mayor
Barbara Murray — Lady Caterham
John Le Mesurier — Charles Arthur Ford, The Sandman
Hugh Lloyd — Edward Cox, Wally's assistant
Norman Bird — Council Committee Man
Kevin Brennan — Landlord
Eddie Byrne — Ice Cream Assistant
Mario Fabrizi — Nevil Shanks
Nicholas Webb — Peter
Brian Bedford - Lady Caterham's 1st escort
 Peter Myers - Lady Caterham's 2nd escort
Peter Vaughan — Council Committee Man
Norman Chappell — Footman
Gerald Harper — First Drunk
Walter Hudd — Clergyman
Hattie Jacques — Dolly Zarathusa, the Fortune Teller
Michael Ripper — Waiter
Russell Waters — Bobby Bachelor the band leader
Carole Ann Ford — Girl in seaside kiosk

Background
The film is a gentle but bitter-sweet comedy. In an early scene, Wally and Delia have breakfast in almost total silence, and the scene demonstrates that they are married from habit, and no longer have anything in common.

In the following scene, Wally angrily rams a bunch of flowers up a porcelain pig's backside, which is later discovered by Delia in a socially awkward situation. The flowers were first intended to go up the pig's nose, but Hancock argued that the joke had to be stronger and so a prop with a suitable orifice was made. The scene with Wally was cut from the 2006 DVD (in 4:3 aspect ratio) in "Tony Hancock Collection" released by Optimum Releasing, and from many television versions, leaving only the moment when Delia finds the flowers; the following scene, when Wally goes to join his assistant Edward in his workshop, is also cut, so this cut version runs for only 88 minutes. An uncut (97 minutes) version (in its original theatrical aspect ratio of 1:1.66) was released on DVD and Blu-ray by Network in 2019, and was shown on Talking Pictures TV in 2021.

In another scene, Wally retreats from the rain into an ice cream parlour with a small boy, played by Sylvia Syms' nephew, Nicholas Webb. The boy asks for a large sundae (a "Piltdown Glory") and Wally orders the same. Then, because he is uncertain of the correct technique for eating the dessert, Wally carefully watches the boy and imitates his every move. The scene was completed from several different takes, between which Hancock sipped vodka to wash away the taste of the ice cream which he strongly disliked. The scene was originally intended to be done in a shorter time frame, but Hancock believed that drawing it out longer would work better and hold more impact and humour for viewers.

Several actors from Hancock's earlier television series Hancock's Half Hour also appear in supporting roles: John Le Mesurier, Hugh Lloyd, Mario Fabrizi and (briefly) Hattie Jacques. Syms was cast as Delia after Billie Whitelaw withdrew. Roger Wilmut, in Tony Hancock: Artiste (1978), argues that the climactic food fight escalates too quickly and that a more experienced director would have given it more time to develop comedically.

The film itself was partly shot on location in Bognor Regis, and when the producers asked for some local people to take parts as extras, over 2,000 people turned up. Many parts of the town are shown in the film; the pier and the town hall feature alongside other areas such as Spencer Street, Belmont Street, and York Road, beside the Esplanade and Royal Hotel, where the film crew stayed. Tony Hancock himself stayed at the more expensive and smarter Royal Norfolk Hotel during filming.

Reception
Filmink magazine dubbed it "The Film Hancock Did after Sacking His Writers Which No One Really Likes".

References

External links
 

1963 films
1963 comedy films
1960s English-language films
British comedy films
British black-and-white films
Films about social class
Films directed by Jeremy Summers
Films shot at Associated British Studios
1960s British films